7th Street/Metro Center station is an underground light rail and rapid transit (known locally as a subway) station on the A, B, D, and E lines of the Los Angeles Metro Rail system. The station also has street level stops for the J Line of the Los Angeles Metro Busway system. The station is located under 7th Street, after which the station is named, at its intersections with Figueroa, Flower and Hope Streets. This station is the current northern and eastern terminus for the A Line and E Line, respectively. Both lines are expected to be extended in 2023 as part of the Regional Connector project.

It is officially named 7th Street/Metro Center/Julian Dixon station after former U.S. Rep. Julian Dixon, who had a pivotal role in obtaining the federal funding that enabled construction of the Metro Rail system.

History 
7th Street/Metro Center was constructed by the Southern California Rapid Transit District, which later became part of today's LA Metro, as part of the first  minimum operating segment (MOS-1) of the Metro Rail subway line. Ground was broken for the project on September 29, 1986.

The upper level of this station, used by light rail trains, opened on February 15, 1991, nearly two years before the rest of the MOS-1 subway stations. However, the opening was several months after the rest of the Blue Line's (now A Line) stations. The lower level subway platform opened with the rest of the MOS-1 segment stations on January 30, 1993.

Metro spent nearly $2 million worth of enhancements to 7th Street/Metro Center station as part of the Expo Line project, which was completed weeks before the Expo Line (now E Line) began service to La Cienega/Jefferson station.  These enhancements included a new dispatch booth and improved signage in the station.

Service

Station layout 

The station was the first underground station in the Metro system, and consists of three underground levels. The main concourse is on the first level down, the light rail side platforms are on the second level down, while the heavy rail island platform is on the third level down. A small first level mezzanine connects the light rail side platforms. The Metro Silver Line stops at the street level next to the station's entrances. The station has direct access to The Bloc Shopping Mall (formerly known as Broadway/Macy's Plaza) with a pedestrian-friendly entrance from the mall directly to the subway station.

This is one of only two stations in the entire system that has underground side platforms, the other being the Wilshire/Vermont station.

Hours and frequency

Connections 
In addition to the rail and busway services, 7th Street/Metro Center station is a major hub for municipal bus lines. , the following connections are available:

 Antelope Valley Transit Authority: 785*
 Big Blue Bus (Santa Monica): Rapid10*
 City of Santa Clarita Transit: 799*
 Foothill Transit: Silver Streak, *, *, *, *, *, *
 LADOT Commuter Express: *, *, *, *, *, *, *, *
 LADOT DASH: A, B, E, F
 Montebello Bus Lines: 40, 50, 90Express*
 Torrance Transit: 4X*
Note: * indicates commuter service that operates only during weekday rush hours.

As a Filming Location
Due to the design of the station and the popularity of the film industry in Los Angeles, the station has been featured in various movies and music videos over the years

Films
The Dark Knight Rises
Captain Marvel
Roman J. Israel, Esq.

Music Videos
Taylor Swift - Delicate - 2018
Lonely Day - System of A Down - 2006
What It's Like - Everlast - 1998

Future service 

When the Regional Connector is complete and opens for service (projected 2023), this station will no longer be the terminus for the A and E Lines. Instead, the rail lines will continue northeast to the rebuilt Little Tokyo/Arts District station on the current L Line. In addition, a complete restructuring of service will commence as follows:

 The E Line (colored gold on maps; the aqua color will be defunct) will run between Santa Monica and East Los Angeles.
 The A Line (colored blue on maps) will run from Long Beach and continue north to Azusa (Pomona 2025).

References

External links 

 Station connections overview
 OpenStreetMap relation for the station

Los Angeles Metro Busway stations
A Line (Los Angeles Metro) stations
E Line (Los Angeles Metro) stations
Railway stations in Los Angeles
D Line (Los Angeles Metro) stations
B Line (Los Angeles Metro) stations
J Line (Los Angeles Metro)
Railway stations in the United States opened in 1991
Buildings and structures in Downtown Los Angeles
1991 establishments in California
Bus stations in Los Angeles